The Type CQ is an unlicensed Chinese variant of the M16 rifle manufactured by Norinco. According to the Norinco website, the rifle is officially known as CQ 5.56.

It can be distinguished from other AR-15 and M-16 pattern rifles by its long, revolver-like pistol grip, somewhat rounded handguards, and the unique shape of its stock.

History
The CQ was first introduced in the early 1980s. This weapon is chambered for 5.56×45mm cartridges and it was intended for export sales. Two variants of the CQ rifle are made: the CQ 5.56, also known as the CQ-311 or CQ M-311, the select-fire variant for Military/LE sales; and the CQ M311-1, the semiautomatic version for the civilian market. Later, a carbine variant has been introduced, called the CQ 5.56mm Type A. The Semi-auto sporter have been successful in the civilian market.

The CQ was never adopted by the Chinese military or even unofficially distributed within Chinese troops. Other military uses of the Type CQ assault rifle have been reported within guerrilla and insurgent movements in the Southeast Asian area.

Differences
Though it has the same look as the M16 rifle, there are some modifications to various parts. The most immediately recognizable distinguishing features that tell the Type CQ apart from an M16 rifle are its distinctive handguard and stock, curved pistol grip, and hooded front sight.

The Type CQ rifle, in both its Military/LE and Civilian variants, has a 1:12 rifling pitch which allows it to properly stabilize the M193 "Ball" variant of the 5.56mm ammunition or the Type CJ Chinese clone, as well as any .223 Remington commercial cartridge variant that can be stabilized by the 1:12 pitch rifling barrel (normally Varmint or other simple sporter cartridges, up to a maximum bullet weight of 55 Grains). The M193 "Ball" 5.56mm cartridge was never a NATO standard until the adoption of this weapon system by other nations. Type CQ is chambered in "5.56×45mm NATO", but it will not properly stabilize the NATO standard 5.56mm ammunition (the SS109, M855 in US service), which requires a 1:9 or 1:7 pitch rifling barrel due to a bullet weight of 62 Grains.

Variants

Type CQ assault rifle
Also known as the CQ 5.56, the CQ-311 or the CQ M-311, this is the select-fire assault rifle version intended for military and police use. It is a gas-operated, rotating-bolt full-automatic firearm that feeds from factory-made 20- or 30-round magazines (STANAG magazine clones), firing the M193 "Ball" 5.56×45mm NATO cartridge (manufactured in China by Norinco as the Type CJ cartridge). The Type CQ rifle has a three-position fire selector: Safe, Single Shot, and Full-Automatic fire. The weapon sports a 508mm (19.9 inches) barrel with a 1:12 rifling twist. The main differences within this weapon and the original American-made M16 are in the shape of some metal and plastic parts (namely the stock, the grip, the handguard, and the flash suppressor), and in the type of metal the rifle is made of. While the American AR-15/M16 rifles are built in T70-74 aluminum, the Chinese Type CQ is built in T60-60 aluminum, used to allow the process of metal injection molding to be used instead of forging.

According to the manufacturer's website, the Type CQ assault rifle can be equipped with an under-carried grenade launcher. Norinco manufactures several models of grenade launchers in different calibers, generally clones of the American M203 (known as the LG2-I and LG2-II) or to the Russian GP-25/GP-30 (known as the LG-1, seen mated to the QBZ-95 assault rifle), and a wide array of anti-riot underbarrel launchers. However, seen the lack on the Type CQ assault rifle of a quick-attachment/detachment design hand guard as instead present on the American M16A2 assault rifle and M4 carbine, the installation of an underbarrel grenade launcher on the Type CQ assault rifle requires partial replacement of the handguard.

Type CQ semi-automatic rifle
Also known as the CQ 311-1 or the CQ M311-1, this rifle is the civilian version of the above-mentioned Military model. Nothing changes from the select-fire version, except that the CQ M311-1 rifle is not capable of fully automatic fire, and that the most recently manufactured models shift from the distinctive Type CQ curved pistol grip and hooded front sight to more standard parts, similar to the ones found on other AR-15 rifles. It is manufactured with a semi-automatic only trigger group, and the selector switch only has two positions, for Safety and Fire. The 1:12 barrel rifling allows the rifle to properly shoot and stabilize light .223 Remington commercial cartridges (55 grains & under) and the military surplus 5.56×45mm M193 "Ball" ammunition widely available on the market.

The CQ M311-1 was first available in the North American market in 1987, when only 500 units were sold before the import was halted; reasons for this halt are stated to be several by many sources: the restrictions applied in the United States since 1989 (an import ban signed by George H. W. Bush on 41 types of military-style firearms in the aftermath of the Stockton massacre), a copyright infringement lawsuit from Colt against Norinco or an agreement between the two companies; however none of these assumptions can be supported by official confirms. The CQ M311-1 semiautomatic rifle was available in Canada until it was reclassified as a Prohibited Firearm on May 1, 2020, while any further import into the United States still remains impossible due to restrictions that apply since 1986 and after other pieces of legislation passed in the 1990s and in the early 2000s.

The gun is also available in Europe (particularly Italy), where it is sold with a 10-round detachable clear plastic magazine manufactured in the United States by DPMS Panther Arms (this because the Norinco CQ M311-1 rifles and the DPMS Panther Arms products are imported in Italy by the company NUOVA JAGER srl).

CQ 5.56mm Type A assault carbine
This variant introduced in the year 2006 in several Defense expos worldwide, including the MILIPOL, is a copy of the American M4A1 assault carbine. It features a telescoping stock, a removable carrying handle mounted on a Picatinny rail, and a 368.3mm (14.5 inch) barrel. The CQ Type A carbine variant is able to stabilize both M193 "Ball" and SS109/M855 variants of the 5.56mm cartridge, as would be expected from a rifle with a 1:9 barrel rifling twist. It will quickly accept the installation of grenade launchers due to the quick attachment/detachment handguard design and to the step-cut barrel.

The CQ 5.56mm Type A assault carbine is the only Type CQ variant known to be in official use with a regular Armed force, having been purchased in significant quantities by the DECEI (Destacamento Conjunto de Empleo Inmediato "Joint Quick Deployment Detachment") of the Paraguayan Army. A semi-automatic version of this carbine was available on the civilian market for sports shooters in Canada until their prohibition, Italy, Ukraine, and South Africa.

CS/LM11
The CS/LM11 was unveiled in 2010 at foreign weapons expo conventions, made by Huaqing Machinery Company. It can fire both SS109 and M193-based 5.56 NATO ammo. It's an offshoot of the CQ, with improvements made to barrel from 6,000 to 12,000 rounds fired.

DIO Model S-5.56 assault rifle
In the year 2003, the Defense Industries Organization of Iran began marketing the S-5.56 (Sayyad) rifle, an unlicensed clone of the Type CQ. It is also known as SRAG-15. It had been first unveiled in the West in 2001. It was originally designed for export sales. But has been shown in use by Revolutionary Guards special forces units.

The rifle itself is offered in two variants. The S-5.56 A1 with a 19.9-inch barrel and 1:12 pitch rifling (1 turn in 305mm), optimised for the use of the M193 Ball cartridge. The S-5.56 A3 with a 20-inch barrel and a 1:7 pitch rifling (1 turn in 177, 8mm), optimized for the use of the SS109 cartridge.

There is also a variant with quad-rail handguards and telescopic CAA CBS-style buttstock and sometimes with extended quad-rail and cut carry handle.

TERAB rifle
The Terab rifle manufactured by the MIC (Military Industry Corporation) of Sudan is a clone of the Iranian DIO Sayyad-5,56, itself a clone of the Norinco CQ. The manufacturer's website lists it as a 7.62×51mm NATO which would make it more of a copy of the AR-10. The Sudan has a background in military usage of the AR-10, having employed it as its standard service rifle from 1957 to 1989. Recent updates show that MIC lists the Terab with a caliber of 5.56 NATO.

ARMADA rifle and TRAILBLAZER carbine
The "Armada" rifle is a clone of the Norinco CQ manufactured by S.A.M. – Shooter's Arms Manufacturing, a.k.a. Shooter's Arms Guns & Ammo Corporation, headquartered in Metro Cebu, Republic of the Philippines.

S.A.M. launched the Armada rifle in 2009, making it available to local government units and/or active law enforcement and military agencies in the Philippines and abroad. The Armada is a select-fire rifle composed of two receivers (upper and lower) manufactured in forged aluminum, uses a 22-inch barrel with a 1:9 right-hand twist (able to stabilize both M193 "Ball" and SS109/M855 variants of the 5.56mm cartridge), Norinco CQ-style plastic parts (grip, stock, handguard), flip-up rear sight adjustable for windage, front post sight adjustable for elevation, and feeds by STANAG magazines. The total weight of the weapon unloaded is claimed to reach 3.3 kilograms, with an overall length of 38.5 inches.

A carbine version of the Armada rifle, similar to the Norinco CQ 5'56mm Type A, has also been launched under the name of "Trailblazer".

CQ-D
Export-specific automatic rifle of the CQ family, featuring upgraded Picatinny rails & foregrip and offered by the China Jing An Import & Export Corp.

Users

 : Type CQ 311 used by Royal Cambodian Army, along with M16 rifle. CQ 5.56mm Type A used by 911 Para-Commando Special Forces.
 : Said to be used by the People's Armed Police Snow Leopard Commando Unit.
 : Seen in the hands of Ghanaian peacekeepers in Mali, and used by the Ghana Navy
 : Used by Revolutionary Guards special forces. CQ 5.56mm and CQ Type A (limited quantity) variants. Iran locally produces its own variant, S-5.56.
 : Used by National Liberation Army.
 : Used by the RELA Corps Department as a training weapon alongside the M16A1. Some rumours state that many M16A1 have had the standard forwards grips (old or damaged parts) changed to CQ grips for cost saving purposes.
 : CQ and CQ-A used by Korean People's Army Ground Force
 : Norinco CQ-5.56mm Type A adopted by the Paraguayan Army Special Forces.
 : 6000 units (2 batches of 3,000 units each on June and October 2017 respectively) CQ-A5 donated by the Chinese government to the Armed Forces of the Philippines.
 
 : Used by Sudan People's Liberation Army/Movement, South Sudan Liberation Movement and Lou Nuer and Murle militias
 : CQ M311-1 Used by the South Sudan Democratic Movement/Army
 : Seen in the hands of Syrian opposition forces in the Syrian Civil War.
 : Sold to the Royal Thai Navy and Air and Coastal Defense Command.

Non-state groups and terrorist entities
 : Captured from Shiite Militia and Syrian Army.

References

5.56 mm assault rifles
Assault rifles of the People's Republic of China
ArmaLite AR-10 derivatives
Norinco